Manor Township is a township in Armstrong County, Pennsylvania, United States. The population was 4,190 at the 2020 census, a decrease from the figure of 4,227 tabulated in 2010.

Geography
Manor Township is located in central Armstrong County. It is bordered to the west by the Allegheny River and by the boroughs of Ford Cliff, Ford City, and Manorville. The borough of Kittanning borders the short, northwestern edge of the township. Crooked Creek forms the southern border of the township, and Cowanshannock Creek meanders through a small northeast section of the township. Ross Island is within the township in the Allegheny River.

Demographics

As of the census of 2000, there were 4,231 people, 1,752 households, and 1,254 families residing in the township.  The population density was 254.7 people per square mile (98.4/km2).  There were 1,879 housing units at an average density of 113.1/sq mi (43.7/km2).  The racial makeup of the township was 98.49% White, 0.61% African American, 0.12% Native American, 0.09% Asian, 0.02% Pacific Islander, 0.09% from other races, and 0.57% from two or more races. Hispanic or Latino of any race were 0.38% of the population.

There were 1,752 households, out of which 27.5% had children under the age of 18 living with them, 60.6% were married couples living together, 7.4% had a female householder with no husband present, and 28.4% were non-families. 25.2% of all households were made up of individuals, and 13.8% had someone living alone who was 65 years of age or older.  The average household size was 2.40 and the average family size was 2.87.

The township median age of 43 years was significantly more than the county median age of 40 years. The distribution by age group was 21.7% under the age of 18, 5.8% from 18 to 24, 26.0% from 25 to 44, 25.6% from 45 to 64, and 20.9% who were 65 years of age or older.  The median age was 43 years. For every 100 females there were 94.4 males.  For every 100 females age 18 and over, there were 93.2 males.

The median income for a household in the township was $34,452, and the median income for a family was $43,603. Males had a median income of $31,491 versus $22,668 for females. The per capita income for the township was $18,789.  About 6.0% of families and 7.3% of the population were below the poverty line, including 10.5% of those under age 18 and 4.6% of those age 65 or over.

History
Manor Township appears in the 1876 Atlas of Armstrong County, Pennsylvania. Its early history is detailed in Robert Walter Smith's 1883 History of Armstrong County.

Cemeteries
Appleby Manor Presbyterian Church Cemetery
Black / Herman Church Cemetery
Ford City Cemetery
Holy Trinity Cemetery
Oakland Cemetery
Saint Marys Cemetery
Ukrainian / Saint Marys Ukrainian Catholic Cemetery

References

External links

Manor Township official website

Populated places established in 1769
Townships in Armstrong County, Pennsylvania